The European Organisation for Rare Diseases (EURORDIS) is a non-governmental patient-driven alliance of patient organizations and individuals active in the field of rare diseases, that promotes research on rare diseases and commercial development of orphan drugs. EURORDIS is dedicated to improving the quality of life of all people living with rare diseases in Europe. It was founded in 1997; it is supported by its members and by the French Muscular Dystrophy Association (AFM), the European Commission, corporate foundations and the health industry.

There are an estimated 20–30 million people living with rare diseases in Europe alone, and an estimated 6,000 rare diseases.
EURORDIS represents more than 960 rare disease organisations in 63 different countries (of which 26 are EU Member States), covering more than 2,000 rare diseases.

EURORDIS is a development of the patient self-advocacy movement, itself widely attributed to AIDS activism.

EURORDIS was the founding partner of Rare Disease Day in 2008 and remains its lead coordinator.

National organisations with a similar focus include National Organization for Rare Disorders (NORD) in the United States, Canadian Organization for Rare Disorders (CORD) in Canada, Organization for Rare Diseases India (ORDI) in India, Allianz Chronischer Seltener Erkrankungen (ACHSE) in Germany, and Federación Española de Enfermedades Raras (FEDER) in Spain.

See also
 Orphanet

References

External links
 EURORDIS official website
 EURORDIS and NORD project to develop Online Patient Communities
 Global website for Rare Disease Day information and activities

Medical and health organizations based in France
European medical and health organizations
Patients' organizations
Biobank organizations
International organizations based in France